Highway 930 was a provincial highway in the Canadian province of Saskatchewan. The Highway ran from Highway 2 to Highway 969 through the Waskesiu River Recreation Site and the town of Montreal Lake.

Highway 969 used to follow Candle Lake Road south of Montreal Lake; however, when the road was removed from the provincial highway system, Highway 930 became part of Highway 969.

See also 
Roads in Saskatchewan
Transportation in Saskatchewan

References 

930